Papias is a Neotropical genus of grass skipper butterflies in the family Hesperiidae.

Species
The following species are recognised in the genus Papias:
Papias allubita (Butler, 1877)
Papias amyrna (Mabille, 1891)
Papias cascatona Mielke, 1992 - Brazil
Papias dictys Godman, [1900] - Mexico, Guatemala, Costa Rica, Panama
Papias integra (Mabille, 1891)
Papias phaeomelas (Hübner, [1831]) - Mexico to Brazil, Trinidad, French Guiana 
Papias phainis Godman, [1900] - Mexico, Guatemala, Costa Rica, Brazil, Paraguay, Ecuador, Guyana
Papias projectus Bell, 1942 - Ecuador
Papias quigua Evans, 1955 - Venezuela
Papias subcostulata (Herrich-Schäffer, 1870) - Brazil, Surinam, Honduras, Colombia, Bolivia
Papias tristissimus Schaus, 1902 - Peru

References

Natural History Museum Lepidoptera genus database

External links
Funet

Hesperiinae
Hesperiidae genera
Taxa named by Frederick DuCane Godman